Sandalia is a genus of sea snails, marine gastropod mollusks in the subfamily Eocypraeinae of the family Ovulidae.

Species
Species within the genus Sandalia include:
Sandalia meyeriana (Cate, 1973)
Sandalia triticea (Lamarck, 1810)
 † Sandalia vibrayana (de Raincourt, 1870) 
Synonyms
Sandalia bridgesi Lorenz, 2009: synoym of Sandalia triticea (Lamarck, 1810) (junior subjective synonym)
 Sandalia pontia C. N. Cate, 1975: synonym of Sandalia triticea (Lamarck, 1810)
 Sandalia rhodia (A. Adams, 1854): synonym of Sandalia triticea (Lamarck, 1810)

References

Ovulidae